Caro Soles is a Canadian author of science fiction, mystery and erotica literature, who has published work both in her own name and under the pen name Kyle Stone.

Background
Previously a high school French language teacher, when Soles decided she wanted to become a writer she initially tried her hand at a romance novel, instead turning to erotica when her first attempt turned out more BDSM-themed than romantic.

Career
Her erotic works, published as Kyle Stone, centred on gay male characters; in his 2002 Encyclopedia of Literature in Canada, W. H. New identified Stone as the most commercially successful author of gay literature in Canada. Many, but not all, of her Kyle Stone books were hybrids of erotica and science fiction. During this era, she also co-edited several anthologies of gay male erotica by other writers under her own name, becoming embroiled in the ongoing Canada Customs controversy around shipments to LGBT bookstores such as Glad Day and Little Sister's when her anthology Bizarre Dreams was confiscated by customs agents despite being a Canadian book.

In 2001, she decided to branch out from writing erotica, publishing her first conventional science fiction novel, The Abulon Dance, under her own name. Throughout her career as a writer, she has also taught creative writing at Toronto's George Brown College, and was a founder and organizer of the Bloody Words conference for crime writers.

Awards
She was presented with the Derrick Murdoch Award by the Crime Writers of Canada in 2002, and her mystery novel Drag Queen in the Court of Death was a Lambda Literary Award nominee in the Gay Mystery category at the 20th Lambda Literary Awards.

Works

as Kyle Stone
The Initiation of PB500 (1993)
The Citadel (1994)
Rituals (1996)
Fire and Ice (1996)
Fantasy Board (1996)
The Hidden Slave (1997)
MENagerie (2000)

as Caro Soles
The Abulon Dance (2001)
The Tangled Boy (2002)
Drag Queen in the Court of Death (2007)
The Danger Dance (2007)
The Deja Dance (2012)
A Mutual Understanding (2012)

Anthologies
Bizarre Dreams (1994)
Meltdown! (1994)
Hot Bauds (1995)
Hot Bauds 2 (1997)
Bloody Words (2003)
Blood on the Holly (2007)
Don Juan and Men (2009)
nEvermore! (2015)

References

External links

20th-century Canadian novelists
21st-century Canadian novelists
20th-century Canadian short story writers
21st-century Canadian short story writers
Canadian women novelists
Canadian women short story writers
Canadian erotica writers
Canadian science fiction writers
Canadian mystery writers
Canadian anthologists
Women mystery writers
Women science fiction and fantasy writers
Women erotica writers
Writers from Toronto
Living people
Year of birth missing (living people)
20th-century Canadian women writers
21st-century Canadian women writers